Nicoletta Luciani (born 22 November 1979 in Chiaravalle) is an Italian professional volleyball player, playing as a libero. She now plays for Cuatto Volley Giaveno.

References

1979 births
Living people
Sportspeople from the Province of Ancona
Italian women's volleyball players